The 1914 UCI Track Cycling World Championships were the World Championship for track cycling. They took place in Ordrup near Copenhagen, Denmark on 2 August 1914. One event for men was contested; more events were scheduled but were canceled because World War I had started, and contestants rushed home.

Medal summary

Medal table

References

Track cycling
UCI Track Cycling World Championships by year
International sports competitions in Copenhagen
International cycle races hosted by Denmark
1914 in track cycling
1914 in Copenhagen